Re:Zero − Starting Life in Another World is a Japanese light novel series written by Tappei Nagatsuki and illustrated by Shinichirou Otsuka.  The series has received three manga adaptations and a number of other spinoffs.

Re:Zero was originally a web novel serialized on the Shōsetsuka ni Narō website from April 2012, before being acquired for print publication by Media Factory, who published the first volume under their MF Bunko J imprint on January 24, 2014. Thirty-two volumes have been published to date, as well as five side story novels and eight short story collections.

The series' first three arcs have been adapted into separate manga series. The first, by Daichi Matsue, was published by Media Factory between June 2014 and March 2015.  The second, by Makoto Fugetsu, has been published by Square Enix since October 2014.  Matsue launched the third adaptation, also published by Media Factory, in May 2015.  Additionally, Media Factory published a manga anthology in June 2016.

Both the novels and the manga adaptations are published in North America by Yen Press, who announced the licenses on December 2, 2015.

Light novels

Volumes

Ex

Short story collections

Manga

A Day in the Capital
A manga adaptation by Daichi Matsue, titled , began serialization in the August 2014 issue of Media Factory's seinen manga magazine Monthly Comic Alive on June 27, 2014.  The final volume was released on March 23, 2015.

On December 2, 2015, Yen Press announced that they had licensed the series.

A Week at the Mansion
A second manga, titled , with art by  Makoto Fugetsu, began serialization in Square Enix's seinen magazine Monthly Big Gangan on October 25, 2014.

The second adaptation has also been licensed by Yen Press.

Truth of Zero
Daichi Matsue serialized a third manga,  in Comic Alive from July 2015 issue released on May 27, 2015 to February 21, 2020. It was compiled in eleven volumes.

The third manga has also been licensed for publication by Yen Press.

The Sanctuary and the Witch of Greed
A fourth manga is being serialized with art from Haruna Atori.

The fourth manga has also been licensed for publication by Yen Press.

Anthology
Media Factory began publishing a manga anthology, titled  in June 2016.

References

External links
  at the official light novel website 
 at Big Gangan 

Re:Zero Starting Life in Another World
Re:Zero Starting Life in Another World
volumes